Falcone is an American crime drama television series that ran for one season on CBS from April 4 until April 12, 2000. The story follows Joseph D. Pistone (Jason Gedrick), an FBI agent who goes undercover to bring down the American Mafia. The events depicted were based on a true story, which was also portrayed in the film Donnie Brasco, which was originally based on the autobiographical book Donnie Brasco: My Undercover Life in the Mafia by Joseph D. Pistone and Richard Woodley.

Cast
Jason Gedrick as Joseph D. Pistone/"Joe Falcone"
Sonny Marinelli as Jimmy Suits
P. R. Paul as Pasche
Allan Steele as Sally Soaps
Eric Roberts as Raymond "The Madman" Ricci
Leo Rossi as Noah Dietrich
Titus Welliver as Santino 'Sonny' Napoli
Amy Carlson as Maggie Pistone
Lillo Brancato Jr. as Alberto 'Lucky' Fema

Production
The series had been expected to air on CBS in fall 1999, but it was initially left off the 1999–2000 television schedule. The pilot episode had been screened for CBS executives a week after the Columbine High School massacre, and CBS Television president Les Moonves thought its violent content was inappropriate to air so soon after the massacre.

The pilot was filmed in New York City, but after it was picked up for a series, the other eight episodes were filmed in Toronto for budgetary reasons.

Episodes

References

External links
 
 

2000 American television series debuts
2000 American television series endings
2000s American drama television series
CBS original programming
English-language television shows
Television series about the Federal Bureau of Investigation
Television series about organized crime
Television series based on actual events
Television series by CBS Studios
Television series by Sony Pictures Television
Television shows filmed in Toronto
Television shows based on non-fiction books
Television shows filmed in New York City
Television shows set in New York City
Works about the American Mafia